Bisch is a surname. Notable people with the surname include:

Art Bisch (1926–1958), American racing driver
Thierry Bisch (born 1953), French artist